Zoya Dus (born 24 November 1952) is a Ukrainian former freestyle swimmer. She competed in two events at the 1968 Summer Olympics for the Soviet Union.

References

External links
 

1952 births
Living people
Ukrainian female freestyle swimmers
Olympic swimmers of the Soviet Union
Swimmers at the 1968 Summer Olympics
Sportspeople from Luhansk
Soviet female freestyle swimmers